Chichi Nikuti (also Romanized as Chīchī Nīkūtī) is a village in Ahandan Rural District, in the Central District of Lahijan County, Gilan Province, Iran. At the 2006 census, its population was 174, in 45 families.

References 

Populated places in Lahijan County